Duff A. Abrams (1880, Illinois, – 1965, New York) was an American researcher in the field of composition and properties of concrete. He developed the basic methods for testing concrete characteristics still in use today. A professor with the Lewis Institute, he studied the component materials of concrete in the early 20th century.

D. A. Abrams was researcher, professor, and director of the research laboratory of the Portland Cement Association in Chicago. He investigated the influence of the composition of concrete mixes on the strength of the end product.

Some of the results of his research was: 
 the definition of the concept of fineness modulus; 
 the definition of the water-cement ratio;
 a test method for the workability of a concrete mix by using what is called 'Abrams cone', see concrete slump test.

In a comprehensive research program, Abrams established the relationship between the water-cement ratio and the compressive strength of concrete. The results were first published in 1918 in D. A. Abrams, Design of Concrete Mixtures, Bulletin 1, Structural Materials Research Laboratory, Lewis Institute, Chicago, 1918.

He was also president of the American Concrete Association (ACI) from 1930 until 1931.

He was elected in 1915 a fellow of the American Association for the Advancement of Science. He was awarded the Frank P. Brown Medal in 1942.

Bibliography
 1913 –  Tests of Bond Between Concrete and Steel
 1918 – Design of Concrete Mixtures (The effect of the water content and the grain size and grain size distribution on the compressive strength of concrete. Test methods for the water-cement ratio and fineness modulus). 
 1919 – Effect of Curing Condition on Wear and Strength of Concrete (Describing 120 tests on cylinder-shaped samples and 300 tests on cubic samples in various moisture conditions and testing periods varying from 3 days to 4 months). 
 1919 – Effect of Fineness of Cement on Plasticity and Strength of Concrete  (Experimental research on the effect of the fineness of concrete and various types of additives on plasticity and strength). 
 1920 – Effect of Hydrated Lime and Other Powdered Admixtures in Concrete 
 1920 – Effect of Storage of Cement  (Investigation of storage conditions for periods up to 5 years). 
 1920 – Effect of Tannic Acid on Strength of Concrete 
 1921 – Quantities of Materials for Concrete, D. A. Abrams en Stanton Walker  (Recipes for concrete reporting its strength after 28 days of curing ranging from 2000 to 4000 psi). 
 1922 – Flexural Strength of Plain Concrete  (Relationship between flexural strength and compressive strength)

References

External links
 
 An extract - Design of Concrete Mixtures
 List of Publications by D.A. Abrams on scholar.google.com

1880 births
1965 deaths
American civil engineers
Concrete pioneers
People from Cook County, Illinois
Engineers from Illinois
Fellows of the American Association for the Advancement of Science